TSS FC Rovers are a Canadian soccer team based in Burnaby, British Columbia, Canada that play in League1 British Columbia. Established for the 2017 PDL season by general manager Will Cromack and head coach Colin Elmes, the Rovers are the under-23 team of the TSS Academy, one of the largest soccer schools in British Columbia's Lower Mainland.

History

Founding

TSS (Total Soccer Systems) Academy was founded in 1997, based in Richmond, British Columbia.

PDL and WPSL era
In late 2016, they purchased the rights to Premier Development League franchise of the Washington Crossfire, creating a team in British Columbia fielding their first roster in the spring of 2017. They have a supporters group called the "Swanguardians" in reference to the Rovers home stadium Swangard Stadium, who previously attended Vancouver Whitecaps games when they played out of Swangard Stadium, prior to their joining the MLS. When these supporters heard about the Rovers returning soccer back to the iconic stadium, they came out in support with much fanfare. The team has a stated policy of fostering Canadian talent, or players eligible for the Canadian men's national teams, stating every player must be "either a Canadian citizen, permanent resident or refugee or immigrant with an intent to one day wear the Maple Leaf."

2018 saw the founding of the women's side to play in the WPSL, notable signings included Canada WNT players Jordyn Huitema and Julia Grosso. In 2018, the men's side saw the team's first truly non-Canadian signing in Dutch, former Toronto FC midfielder Nick Soolsma as a player-coach.

The club competed with the Victoria Highlanders for the Juan de Fuca Plate, which was awarded annually to the best PDL/USL League Two club in British Columbia. The Rovers won it in 2018 and 2019.

In 2020, the club updated their logo to include a sword fern, an indigenous plant to coastal BC.

League1 BC era 
On November 1, 2021 it was announced that the club would be playing in the inaugural season of League1 British Columbia. In addition, the club decided to change their ownership structure, to become fan-owned, similar to clubs in Germany, with fans having voting rights and a say in the team's direction. Fans will own 49% of the team through this initiative. In the debut League1 BC season, the men's team advanced to the Championship Final after finishing in second place in the regular season standings, where they defeated Varsity FC in penalty kicks to win the inaugural League1 BC title. As champions, they qualified for the national 2023 Canadian Championship.

Current roster 
Men

Women

Year-by-year

Men

Women

Notable former players 
The following players have either moved on to the professional ranks after playing for the PDL/WPSL/L1BC team club, played for their senior national teams, or played professionally before joining the club.

Men

  Mamadi Camara
   Gabriel Escobar
  Thomas Gardner
  Jordan Haynes
  Patrick Metcalfe
   Marcello Polisi
  Matteo Polisi
  Fugo Segawa
  Nick Soolsma
  Desmond Tachie
  Zach Verhoven
  Joel Waterman
  Kristian Yli-Hietanen

Women

  Jordyn Huitema
  Julia Grosso
  Emma Regan

Honours

Men 
Major
League1 BC Championship
 Champions (1): 2022
Minor
Juan de Fuca Plate
 Winners (2): 2018, 2019
 Runners-up (1): 2017

Combined 
Juan de Fuca Plate
 Runners-up (1): 2022

Supporters 
The team is supported by The Swanguardians, a small group of supporters who stand at the south end of the pitch and support the team with banners, smoke displays, and original chants made primarily from Canadian songs. The group was formed in 2017 shortly after the founding of the team, and continues to support its former players in their college, professional, and national team careers on social media through their #AlwaysARover hashtag.

References

External links
 

2017 establishments in British Columbia
Association football clubs established in 2017
USL League Two teams
Soccer clubs in British Columbia
Sport in Burnaby
United Soccer League teams based in Canada
Expatriated football clubs
League1 British Columbia clubs
Women's Premier Soccer League teams